Bilkisu Labaran is a Nigerian journalist, editor and head of Africa News & Current affairs at BBC.  She played a vital role in the establiment of BBC pidgin and is the first Nigerian BBC editor. She currently works as an executive at BBC Africa Eye documentaries 

Before joining the BBC, she was a lecturer at Ahmadu Bello University Zaria, Nigeria and was the Nigeria Country Director for the BBC World Service Trust. and was ranked number five of 25 Most Powerful Women in Nigerian journalism in 2020, compiled by Women in Journalism Africa.

References 

Living people
Nigerian journalists
Nigerian women journalists
21st-century journalists
Year of birth missing (living people)